Latvia participated in the Junior Eurovision Song Contest 2003 which took place on 15 November 2003, in Copenhagen, Denmark. The Latvian broadcaster Latvijas Televīzija (LTV) organised a national final in order to select the Latvian entry for the 2003 contest. On 8 June 2003, Dzintars Čīča won the national final and was selected to represent Latvia with the song "Tu esi vasarā".

Before Junior Eurovision

National final
56 songs were submitted to LTV. Ten entries were selected for the national final, and the competing artists and songs were announced on 17 March 2003. 

The final took place on 8 June 2003, hosted by Linda Leen and Horens Stalbe. Ten entries competed and the song with the highest number of votes from the public, "Tu esi vasarā" performed by Dzintars Čīča, was declared the winner.

At Junior Eurovision

Voting

References 

Junior Eurovision Song Contest
Latvia
Junior